Seghin (also Romanized as Seghīn and Saghīn) is a village in Gughar Rural District, in the Central District of Baft County, Kerman Province, Iran.

At the 2006 census, its population was 10, in 4 families.

References 

Populated places in Baft County